A Matter of Time is a 1996 novel by Shashi Deshpande. Unusually in Deshpande's fiction the focus is on the impact of the actions of a male character, Gopal, who leaves his family.

References

1996 novels
1996 Indian novels